2SSR FM (the Sutherland Shire Community Radio Association) is a community radio station broadcasting from Gymea in Sutherland Shire, New South Wales, Australia. 2SSR FM is Non Profit and entirely managed by Volunteers.  2SSR FM is a Member Station of the Community Broadcasting Association of Australia (CBAA)

History

2SSR was formed in 1984 with ten foundation members. The permanent licence was obtained in 1991 after several test transmissions. 2SSR began permanently broadcasting on 26 September 1992.

During the 1994 bush fires in the Shire, 2SSR remained on air over the weekend, providing information about evacuations and the fires, and became a vital part of the fire operation. Some commercial radio stations even asked shire residents to tune into 2SSR for the latest information, as it was on air during the night, when it was usually closed. 2SSR received a Community Service Award for its efforts by the NSW government.

Notable live broadcasts have included - Game Calls from Toyota Park with the Cronulla Sharks (Rugby league) home games, live crosses to Canada during the 1994 Commonwealth Games, and to record progress reports of the local yacht in the Sydney to Hobart Yacht Race.

Format and sound

2SSR has a general format to its community and there for provides a diverse range of programmes showcasing jazz, classical, rock, Top 40, dance, folk, blues and roots, country (traditional and modern) Christian and world music, local news and current events as well as programmes in Māori and Macedonian.
2SSR supports Australian Artists by providing 30% Australian music in the majority of 2SSR programs.

Training

2SSR conducts regular Radio Training Courses for people interested in either a career in media or to contribute programs to our local community.  2SSR is located at the Sutherland College of TAFE (Technical and Further Education) NSW, Gymea Campus.

Community participation

2SSRFM is involved with many local community organisations with the station providing Community Service Announcements at no cost to the many non-profit groups within its broadcast area providing listeners with information about the events and services in the community.

External links
 2SSR Homepage
 Sutherland College of TAFE, Gymea
 CBAA Homepage

Radio stations in New South Wales
Community radio stations in Australia
Radio stations established in 1992
Sutherland Shire